John Darren Pearce (born 1971) is a male English former middleweight boxer from the Wellington ABC.

Boxing career
Pearce was a double National champion after winning the prestigious ABA middleweight title in 1996 and 1998.

He represented England in the middleweight (-75 Kg) division and won a gold medal at the 1998 Commonwealth Games in Kuala Lumpur, Malaysia. He defeated Jitender Kumar (India) in the final.

Personal life
Pearce from Middlesbrough was at the time MD of his own double glazing company.

References

Commonwealth Games gold medallists for England
Boxers at the 1998 Commonwealth Games
English male boxers
1971 births
Living people
England Boxing champions
Commonwealth Games medallists in boxing
Middleweight boxers
Medallists at the 1998 Commonwealth Games